Hartman Creek is a stream in Butler County in the U.S. state of Missouri. It is a tributary of Widow Creek.

Hartman Creek has the name of the local Hartman family.

See also
List of rivers of Missouri

References

Rivers of Butler County, Missouri
Rivers of Missouri